A silicide is a type of chemical compound that combines silicon and a (usually) more electropositive element.

Silicon is more electropositive than carbon. Silicides are structurally closer to borides than to carbides.

Similar to borides and carbides, the composition of silicides cannot be easily specified as covalent molecules. The chemical bonds in silicides range from conductive metal-like structures to covalent or ionic. Silicides of all non-transition metals, with exception of beryllium, have been described.

Overview 

Silicon atoms in silicides can have many possible organizations:
Isolated silicon atoms: electrically conductive (or semiconductive) CrSi, MnSi, FeSi, CoSi, and nonconductive , 
Si2 pairs: , hafnium and thorium silicides
Si4 tetrahedra: KSi, RbSi, CsSi
Sin chains: USi, CaSi, SrSi, YSi
Planar hexagonal graphite-like Si layers: β-USi2, silicides of other lanthanoids and actinoids
Corrugated hexagonal Si layers: CaSi2
Open three-dimensional Si skeletons: SrSi2, ThSi2, α-USi2

A silicide prepared by a self-aligned process is called a salicide. This is a process in which silicide contacts are formed only in those areas in which deposited metal (which after annealing becomes a metal component of the silicide) is in direct contact with silicon, hence, the process is self-aligned. It is commonly implemented in MOS/CMOS processes for ohmic contacts of the source, drain, and poly-Si gate.

Alkali and alkaline earth metals 
Group 1 and 2 silicides e.g. Na2Si and Ca2Si react with water, yielding hydrogen and/or silanes.

When magnesium silicide is placed into hydrochloric acid, HCl(aq), the gas silane, SiH4, is produced. This gas is the silicon analogue of methane, CH4, but is more reactive.  Silane is pyrophoric, that is, due to the presence of oxygen, it spontaneously combusts in air:
Mg2Si(s) + 4HCl(aq) → SiH4(g) + 2MgCl2(s)
SiH4 + 2O2 → SiO2 + 2H2O

These reactions are typical of a Group 2 silicide.  Mg2Si reacts similarly with sulfuric acid.  Group 1 silicides are even more reactive.  For example, sodium silicide, Na2Si, reacts rapidly with water to yield sodium silicate, Na2SiO3, and hydrogen gas. Rubidium silicide is pyrophoric, igniting in contact with air.

Transition metals 
The transition metal silicides are, in contrast, usually inert to aqueous solutions of everything with exception of hydrofluoric acid; however, they react with more aggressive agents, e.g. melted potassium hydroxide, or fluorine and chlorine when red-hot.

Other elements 
Mercury, thallium, bismuth, and lead are immiscible with liquid silicon.

Synthesis 

List (incomplete)

Nickel silicide, NiSi
Sodium silicide, Na2Si
Magnesium silicide, Mg2Si
Platinum silicide, PtSi (platinum is actually more electronegative than silicon)
Titanium silicide, TiSi2
Tungsten silicide, WSi2
Molybdenum disilicide, MoSi2
Neptunium silicide, NpSi2

See also
 Binary compounds of silicon

References

Further reading
 

 
Anions